Bruno Bruce Konopka (September 16, 1919 – September 27, 1996) was an American  professional baseball player during the 1940s. A first baseman, his four-season (1942–1943; 1946–1947) professional career was interrupted by service in the United States Navy in the Pacific Theater of Operations during World War II. He was born in Hammond, Indiana, but attended Manual High School in Denver, Colorado, and college at the University of Southern California.

Konopka batted and threw left-handed.

He made his Major League debut in his first pro season. In his first game, June 7 at Shibe Park, he relieved Dick Siebert at first base for the Athletics, but was held hitless in two at bats by Bob Muncrief of the St. Louis Browns. He registered his first MLB hit, a single, as a pinch hitter 16 days later. He spent most of the rest of that season with the Class B Wilmington Blue Rocks, but returned to the Athletics in September to go two-for-four against the Washington Senators on September 19.  He batted only twice for the Athletics in 1943 before being called into the military. Then he split the 1946 season between Philadelphia and the Triple-A Toronto Maple Leafs and San Diego Padres.  In 38 games for the 1946 A's, 20 as the starting first baseman, he collected 22 hits, including four doubles and a triple. Altogether, during his brief MLB career, he had 25 hits, scored nine runs, and logged ten runs batted in. He did not hit a home run.

Konopka played one more year in minor league baseball, in 1947 at the Double-A level, before leaving baseball.  He died in Denver at the age of 77.

References

External links

1919 births
1996 deaths
Atlanta Crackers players
Baseball players from Denver
Baseball players from Indiana
Little Rock Travelers players
Major League Baseball first basemen
Sportspeople from Hammond, Indiana
Philadelphia Athletics players
San Diego Padres (minor league) players
Toronto Maple Leafs (International League) players
Wilmington Blue Rocks (1940–1952) players
United States Navy personnel of World War II